Opostega salaciella is a moth of the family Opostegidae. It is found in Europe.

The wingspan is about 10 mm. The forewings are white; sometimes an indistinct yellowish fascia towards apex, often entirely absent. Hindwings whitish-grey.
The moths fly boldly towards dusk, and come freely to lamps, from June to July depending on the location.

The larvae feed on Rumex acetosella.

References

External links
Swedish moths
lepiforum.de

Opostegidae
Moths of Europe
Moths of Asia
Moths described in 1833